Kliny is a rural locality (a selo) in Bavlenskoye Rural Settlement, Kolchuginsky District, Vladimir Oblast, Russia. The population was 3 as of 2010.

Geography 
Kliny is located 25 km northeast of Kolchugino (the district's administrative centre) by road. Kliny (settlement) is the nearest rural locality.

References 

Rural localities in Kolchuginsky District